Love Breeze is a Smokey Robinson album released in 1978. It was arranged by Sonny Burke.

Track listing

Side one
"Why You Wanna See My Bad Side" (Smokey Robinson, Janie Bradford) - (3:45)
"Love So Fine" (Smokey Robinson) - (4:34)
"Feeling You, Feeling Me" (Homer Talbert, Jerry Butler) - (3:52)
"Madam X" (words: Smokey Robinson; music: Marv Tarplin) - (6:28)

Side two
"Shoe Soul" (words: Smokey Robinson; music: Mike Sutton, Brenda Sutton) - (4:41)
"Trying It Again" (Smokey Robinson, Richard Williams) - (4:53)
"Daylight and Darkness" (Smokey Robinson, Rose Ella Jones) - (4:00)
"I'm Loving You Softly" (Kennis Jones) - (4:29)

Personnel
 Smokey Robinson – lead and backing vocals
 John Barnes – keyboards
 James Bradford – bass piano
 Reginald "Sonny" Burke – keyboards, arrangements (1, 2, 4-8)
 Ronnie McNeir – Fender Rhodes
 Sylvester Rivers – keyboards
 Fred Ross – organ
 Michael Sutton – keyboards, clavinet
 Marlo Henderson – guitar
 Rick Littlefield – guitar
 Marvin Tarplin – guitar 
 Wah-Wah Watson – guitar
 David T. Walker – guitar
 Scott Edwards – bass guitar
 James Jamerson – bass guitar
 Chuck Rainey – bass guitar
 David Shields – bass guitar
 Wayne Tweed – bass guitar
 James Gadson – drums
 Ed Greene – drums
 Scotty Harris – drums
 Paulinho da Costa – percussion
 James Sledge – congas, backing vocals 
 Bob Zimmitti – percussion, vibraphone
 Fred Smith – flutes, reeds, solos
 Michael Jacobsen – cello
 Bob "Boogie" Bowles – arrangements (3)
 Kim Richmond – horn arrangements (5)
 Arthur G. Wright – rhythm and string arrangements (5)
 Melba Bradford – backing vocals
 Cheryl Cooper – backing vocals
 Ivory Davis – backing vocals
 Patricia Henley – backing vocals
 Jesse Richardson – backing vocals
 Claudette Robinson – backing vocals
 Brenda Sutton – backing vocals

Production
 Producers – Smokey Robinson (Tracks 1, 2, 4, 6, 7 & 8); Jerry Butler and Homer Talbert (Track 3); Mike and Brenda Sutton (Track 5)
 Engineers – Don Boehret, Michael Lizzio, Barney Perkins, Bob Robitaille, Michael Schuman, Art Stewart and Art White.
 Assistant Engineer – James Warmack
 Recorded at Motown Recording Studios (Hollywood, CA); ABC Recording Studios (Los Angeles, CA); Kendun Recorders (Burbank, CA).
 Mixed by Russ Terrana
 Mastered by Jack Andrews
 Mixed and Mastered at Motown Recording Studios (Hollywood, CA).
 Art Direction and Design – Wriston Jones
 Illustration – Brian Zick

Smokey Robinson albums
1978 albums
Albums produced by Smokey Robinson
Motown albums